The first series of The Voice เสียงจริงตัวจริง (also known as The Voice Thailand) on 9 September 2012. The show was hosted by Kob Songsit on Channel 3.

Teams
Colour key
 Winner
  Runners-up
  Third/Fourth place
 Eliminated in semi-final
 Eliminated in quarter-final
 Eliminated in first live round
  Eliminated in the Battles

Blind Auditions

 Key
  – Coach hit his/her "I WANT YOU" button
  – Artist eliminated with no coach pressing his or her "I WANT YOU" button
  – Artist defaulted to this coach's team
  – Artist elected to join this coach's team

Episode 1

Group performance: The Voice Thailand Coaches – "Made In Thailand"

Episode 2

Episode 3

Episode 4

Episode 5

Episode 6

Battle Rounds

After the Blind Auditions, each coach had 12-15 contestants for the Battle Rounds. Coaches began narrowing down the playing field by training the contestants with the help of "trusted advisors". Team Kong is advised by Saovanit Navapant, Team Kim by Neung ETC., Team Joey by Thana Laovasut and Team Stamp by Pod Moderndog.

Each episode featured battles consisting of pairings from within each team, and each battle concluded with the respective coach eliminating one of the two contestants or two of the three contestants in some battles for only one winner in that battle; the six winners for each coach advanced to the live shows.

 Key
  – Battle winner 
  – Eliminated artist

Episode 7

Live Performance Rounds
 Key
  – Artist automatically advanced by public vote
  – Artist in the bottom saved by coach's choice
  – Eliminated in first live round
 – Eliminated in quarter-final
 – Eliminated in semi-final

Episode 10: First Round, Week 1
The first live round, week 1, aired on 11 November 2012. Team Kong and Team Kim performed in this episode.

Episode 11: First Round, Week 2
The first live round, week 2, aired on 18 November 2012. Team Joey and Team Stamp performed in this episode.

Episode 12: Quarter-Final, Week 1
The live quarter-final round, week 1, aired on 25 November 2012. Team Kong and Team Kim performed in this episode.

Episode 13: Quarter-Final, Week 2
The live quarter-final round, week 2, aired on 2 December 2012. Team Joey and Team Stamp performed in this episode.

Episode 14: Semi-Final
The live Semi-final round aired on 9 December 2012.

Episode 15: Final Round
The live Final round aired on 15 December 2012. Non Thanon was named the winner.

Results
Key
  – Artist automatically advanced by public vote
  – Artist in the bottom saved by coach's choice
  – Eliminated in first live round
 – Eliminated in quarter-final
 – Eliminated in semi-final

TV Rating

References

External links
The official website

Thailand
2012 Thai television seasons